Gregory Lafayette Roberts (born November 29, 1956) is a former American college and professional football player who played as a guard in the National Football League (NFL) and United States Football League (USFL) for five seasons during the late 1970s and 1980s. He played college football for the University of Oklahoma, and received All-American honors. Roberts was selected in the second round of the 1979 NFL Draft, and played professionally for the NFL's Tampa Bay Buccaneers and USFL's Memphis Showboats.

Roberts was born in Nacogdoches, Texas.

He attended the University of Oklahoma, where he played for coach Barry Switzer's Oklahoma Sooners football team from 1975 to 1978. As a senior in 1978, he was recognized as a consensus first-team All-American and won the Outland Trophy as the best interior lineman in the country.

External links
Bucpower.com bio

1956 births
Living people
All-American college football players
American football offensive guards
Memphis Showboats players
Oklahoma Sooners football players
People from Nacogdoches, Texas
Tampa Bay Buccaneers players